Typhistes is a genus of sheet weavers that was first described by Eugène Louis Simon in 1894.

Species
 it contains four species:
Typhistes antilope Simon, 1894 – Sri Lanka
Typhistes comatus Simon, 1894 (type) – Sri Lanka
Typhistes elephas Berland, 1922 – Ethiopia
Typhistes gloriosus Jocqué, 1984 – South Africa

See also
 List of Linyphiidae species (Q–Z)

References

Araneomorphae genera
Linyphiidae
Spiders of Africa
Spiders of Asia